Rabuor is the headquarters of Kadibo Division of Kisumu County, Kenya. Situated on the Kisumu-Nairobi road (B1 road), this divisional capital is 7.4 kilometres from Kisumu city and approximately 14 kilometers from AheroTown.
It has a population of approximately 10,000.

Kisumu County
Populated places in Nyanza Province